The men's futsal competition for intellectually disabled  at the 2005 Islamic Solidarity Games took place from 9-13 April. All matches were played at the Abdel Aziz University Hall. It was won by the hosts Saudi Arabia who defeated Iran 5-2 in the final to clinch gold.

Group stage
The group winners and runners up advanced to the semi-finals.

Group A

Full table on goalzz

Group B

Full table on goalzz

Knockout stage

Semi-finals

Bronze medal play-off

Gold medal play-off

References
Points table 
Fixtures & results

Futsal at multi-sport events
2005 Islamic Solidarity Games